The Divergent Series: Allegiant (simply known as Allegiant) is a 2016 American dystopian science fiction action film directed by Robert Schwentke with a screenplay by Bill Collage, Adam Cooper, and Noah Oppenheim, and the third and final film in The Divergent Series. It was set to be the first of two cinematic parts based on the final novel of the Divergent trilogy by Veronica Roth (the second cinematic part was to be named Ascendant).

The film stars Shailene Woodley, Theo James, Jeff Daniels, Miles Teller, Ansel Elgort, Zoë Kravitz, Maggie Q, Ray Stevenson, Bill Skarsgård, Octavia Spencer, and Naomi Watts. Set in a post-apocalyptic and dystopian Chicago, the story follows Tris Prior, her boyfriend Four, and their small group of friends escaping over the wall that enclosed the city. Once outside, however, they discover new truths that will shift their alliances and introduce new threats.

Principal photography primarily took place in Atlanta, Georgia, from May 2015 until August that same year. The film was initially titled The Divergent Series: Allegiant – Part 1, however, in September 2015, Part 1 was renamed Allegiant and Part 2 as Ascendant. Allegiant was released on March 18, 2016, in theaters and IMAX and received generally negative reviews from critics, who criticized the lack of originality, character development, and the decision to split the film into two parts. The film was a box-office bomb, grossing just $179 million worldwide against its estimated budget of $110–142 million, becoming the lowest-grossing film in The Divergent Series. Following budget cuts, a theatrical release for Ascendant was dropped in favor of reconfiguring the project as a television film for Starz that would be followed by a spinoff series. Both projects were later canceled, effectively ending the franchise.

Plot
Evelyn re-closes Chicago's wall, and puts Jeanine's coup supporters on trial for their lives. Johanna turns her back on this, and is followed by many newly christened Allegiants. Tris and Four free Caleb and escape over the wall with Tori, Christina, and Peter. Edgar leads Factionless guards to catch them, killing Tori. Edgar catches them in the wastelands, but unknown soldiers with advanced technology rescue the group.

The group is taken to the Bureau of Genetic Welfare, a city of advanced technology hidden behind a cloaking shield. Society's problems were caused by some people tampering with their offspring's genes to give them advantages, but this led to the Purity Wars that destroyed most of the planet. The genetically "pure" (as compared to those with gene modifications, the "damaged") created the Bureau and its series of experiments, located in isolated ruined cities, in an attempt to trigger a naturally pure genome; Tris is the first to show the desired outcome.

Caleb and Peter are assigned to surveillance teams that remotely monitor Chicago, while Christina and Four are assigned to train under Nita in the military. Matthew brings Tris to David, the leader of the Bureau, who gives Tris a device that allows her to view her mother's memories. She sees that her mother was rescued from the wastelands as a child, then volunteered to join the Chicago experiment. Caleb warns Four and Tris of the conflict in Chicago between Allegiants and Factionless. Tris agrees to help David to continue the experiment if he asks the council to intervene in the fighting.

During a military rescue mission to a wasteland village, Four realizes that the Bureau is kidnapping children and wiping their memories. He attempts to warn Tris of the Bureau's intentions, but David interrupts them. Four urges Tris to return with him to end the bloodshed, but she decides to go with David, who agrees to return Four to Chicago with Matthew and some Bureau soldiers. En route, Matthew quietly warns Four that David has ordered his death. Four kills the soldiers, but the transport crashes. Matthew gives Four a device to allow passage through the cloaking shield. Matthew returns to the Bureau — and warns Tris.

Tris disagrees with the council's actions, saying that pure versus damaged is no better than the Chicago Factions, and chastises their refusal to stop the violence in Chicago. The council reveals that David, not them, has full authority over Chicago. David tells her that he intends to reinforce the Factions.

Tris ends her partnership with David and gathers Caleb and Christina in David's hovercar to return to Chicago. Nita helps them escape, revealing that David's rule is not popular with the Bureau. The Factionless capture Four, who confronts Evelyn about ending the violence. Tris, Caleb, and Christina arrive to find the city tearing itself apart at the opening stage of a full assault by the Allegiant. At the Bureau, David makes a deal with Peter in exchange for Peter's promotion and insertion into Chicago to convince Evelyn to deploy a hidden Bureau stockpile of amnesia gas, creating peace by wiping all factions' memories. She agrees, so Peter takes her to a hidden vault.

Four, Tris and Christina fight through the Factionless and arrive at the vault. Four convinces Evelyn to stop the gas attack, as he would not remember her. She capitulates, but a frustrated Peter shoots her in the leg, gloating until the same gas starts flooding the vault itself. Realizing David has betrayed him, Peter opens the vault so that Tris and Four can stop the gas. Peter flees back towards the Bureau, though Four vows to find and kill him.

Caleb arrives and aids Tris in destroying the gas dispersion hub. The group gathers atop the Erudite building as it watches David's hovercar, which autopilots back towards the Bureau. Tris transmits a message to the world, revealing the existence of Bureau and that Chicago was an experiment in genetic purity. Her message tells the Bureau that Chicago is no longer their experiment. Caleb then detonates the explosives they loaded in the hovercar, disrupting the cloak shield and revealing the Bureau to the world.

Cast

 Shailene Woodley as Tris, a Divergent and former Dauntless member 
 Theo James as Four, a former Dauntless instructor and Tris' boyfriend
 Jeff Daniels as David, head of the Bureau of Genetic Welfare, an advanced city formed outside of Chicago
 Miles Teller as Peter
 Ansel Elgort as Caleb, Tris' brother
 Zoë Kravitz as Christina, Tris' best friend
 Maggie Q as Tori, former Dauntless
 Ray Stevenson as Marcus
 Mekhi Phifer as Max, former Dauntless Leader
 Daniel Dae Kim as Jack Kang
 Bill Skarsgård as Matthew, a member of the Bureau of Genetic Welfare who later sides with Tris and Four
 Octavia Spencer as Johanna, former Amity Leader
 Naomi Watts as Evelyn, Four's mother and the leader of Factionless 
 Rebecca Pidgeon as Sarah
 Xander Berkeley as Phillip
 Keiynan Lonsdale as Uriah
 Jonny Weston as Edgar, Evelyn's Factionless second in command 
 Nadia Hilker as Nita
 Andy Bean as Romit
 Zeeko Zaki as Factionless Squad Leader
 Danielle Lyn as Natalie's Friend

Production
Initially intended as a single film based on Allegiant, the producers of The Divergent Series later decided to adapt the novel into two films, similar to what has been done with other young adult novel series adapted into films. The two proposed films were originally titled Allegiant — Part One and Allegiant — Part Two; this was later dropped in favor of assigning the films unique names (Allegiant and Ascendant, respectively).

By March 2015, all of the series cast members had confirmed their involvement, with newcomers Jeff Daniels and Bill Skarsgård added to the cast that April and May, respectively.

Filming began on May 18, 2015, in Atlanta, Georgia, and concluded on August 23, 2015. From June 11 to June 23, filming took place at the Lindale Mill in Lindale, Georgia, where the set was being built in late May.

Music 
In December 2015, it was confirmed that Joseph Trapanese would  return to compose the score for the film. The first track for the Allegiant soundtrack, "Scars", written by Tove Lo, Jakob Jerlström, Ludvig Söderberg, and performed by Tove Lo, was released as a single on February 19, 2016.

Promotion
A teaser trailer was released on September 15, 2015, followed by a full-length trailer two months later, on November 12, 2015. Another full-length trailer was released on January 22, 2016.

Reception

Box office
Allegiant grossed $66.2 million in North America and $113.1 million in other territories for a worldwide total of $179.2 million.

In the United States and Canada, the film was projected to gross around $28–30 million in its opening weekend from 3,740 theaters, which would make it the lowest opening among the franchise. It earned the lowest previews among the series, with $2.35 million from 2,800 theaters. On its opening day, it made $11.9 million (including previews), down 43.6% from Insurgent, becoming the first film in the series to fail to open with over $20 million. Scott Mendelson of Forbes compared the decline in opening day to the third installment of The Chronicles of Narnia film series, Voyage of the Dawn Treader, which had a similar amount of drop. In comparison, the third Hunger Games film, Mockingjay – Part 1 fell only 21% from its previous film. In its opening weekend, the film grossed $29 million from 3,740 theaters, finishing second at the box office behind Zootopia. It was the first film of the franchise not to finish in first at the box office, and its opening was 46% below Divergents and 44% behind Insurgents. Lionsgate president of domestic distribution Richard Fay labeled the opening "pretty solid". As a result of the poor opening, Lionsgate's stock fell the next day, on Monday. Due to Allegiant'''s poor box-office resulting in Lionsgate's stock declining 3.3% by 72 cents to $21.13 in trading, Moody's Investors Service lowered Lionsgate's Speculative Grade Liquidity rating from SGL-2 to SGL-3.The Divergent Series: Allegiant also struggled internationally where Lionsgate does not have operations in most countries and sells distribution rights to partners. It opened in 45 international markets a week ahead of its US debut, from March 9, and will receive a scattered release worldwide. Unlike its predecessor Insurgent, Lionsgate decided not to have a day and date release for Allegiant, instead intending to take advantage of various school holidays in international markets, and at the same time avoid competition with Walt Disney's animated Zootopia. Allegiant took the top spot in its opening day in France, Italy, Belgium, the Netherlands and Sweden. In its opening weekend, it earned $25.2 million from over 7,000 screens in 45 countries. It added 32 markets in its second weekend, earning a total of $22 million from 77 countries, which is down 13%. The top openings were in France ($5 million), Brazil ($2.7 million), the United Kingdom and Ireland ($2.6 million), Mexico ($2.5 million). In the United Kingdom, it posted the lowest opening in the series, opening at No. 2 behind Kung Fu Panda 3 including previews, which is 37% behind the opening of Insurgent. It had a very unsuccessful opening in South Korea with $523,000 from 392 screens. In China, it opened in third place behind The Angry Birds Movie and Captain America: Civil War with $10.8 million. As a result, it helped the film cross the $100 million mark internationally and immediately became the film's second biggest market behind Italy only. In terms of total earnings, its largest markets are China ($18.7 million), France ($15.1 million), followed by Brazil ($6.9 million), the U.K. ($6.5 million), Russia ($6 million) and Spain ($5.1 million).

Due to its underperformance, The Hollywood Reporter called it "the second big-budget miss for Lionsgate this year after Gods of Egypt". Many critics have blamed the underperformance of the film on Lionsgate's decision to split the last novel into two pictures. Due to the box office struggles of Allegiant, Lionsgate had planned to wrap up the film series with a television movie with a prospective television series spinoff. Made on a total budget of $183.6 million, including net production budget, advertising and promotion costs, and domestic home entertainment costs, Deadline Hollywood projected the film to make a mere profit of $3.5 million should it earn a net total of $187.1 million from various platforms (including theatrical revenues, TV rights and DVD sales). By comparison, Divergent made a net profit of $71.8 million and Insurgent $30.6 million. By contrast, The Hollywood Reporter estimated the film lost the studio around $50 million, when factoring together all expenses and revenues.

Critical responseThe Divergent Series: Allegiant was met with mostly negative reviews by critics, who criticized the lack of originality, character advancements, visual effects, and the decision to split the film into two parts. On Rotten Tomatoes, the film has a rating of 11%, based on 193 reviews, with an average rating of 4.10/10. The site's critical consensus reads, "Allegiant improves on previous entries in The Divergent Series on a few superficial levels, but they aren't enough to counteract a sense of growing boredom with a franchise that's gone on too long." Metacritic gives the film a score of 33 out of 100, based on 33 critics, indicating "generally unfavorable reviews". Audiences polled by CinemaScore gave the film an average grade of "B" on an A+ to F scale.

Writing for IGN, Max Nicholson, awarded Allegiant a 4/10, stating that "Allegiant is a prime example of everything that's wrong with modern YA sequels. Instead of embracing or building upon its core themes and constructs, it tears them all down with a wrecking ball of CGI and nonsensical storytelling". Peter Travers of Rolling Stone gave the film a 1/4 stars, stating that "The Divergent Series: Allegiant is another one of those cynical Hollywood cash grabs that takes the third book in bestselling juvie-lit trilogy (see Twilight and The Hunger Games) and stretches that last book into two movies so audiences are tricked into paying twice for egregiously padded piffle".

Cast and crew response
Shailene Woodley expressed disappointment with the quality of Allegiant, claiming that she almost quit acting following the decline of the franchise; co-star Zoë Kravitz voiced similar concerns about the direction of Allegiant and the direction of the series as a whole, saying, "I think as we went on, the story really kinda got lost and nobody really knew what we were doing anymore".

Producer Neil Burger (who directed the first film in the franchise) criticized Lionsgate's decision to split the film into two parts.

Accolades

Expanded franchise
Cancelled fourth film
A theatrical sequel titled The Divergent Series: Ascendant, based on the latter half of the Allegiant book, was originally meant to wrap up the series and was originally set to be released on March 24, 2017, before being pushed back to June 9, 2017, with Lee Toland Krieger directing after Robert Schwentke backed out. The plans for a film were later changed to a television series following the disappointing box office return.

Cancelled television series
In July 2016, after Allegiant underperformed at the box office, it was announced that Lionsgate would instead release Ascendant as a television film that would serve as a lead-in for a television spinoff series, in which both projects would add new characters to the story, moving beyond the books.

In September 2016, Shailene Woodley stated on Today'' that the film versus television decision was not finalized, and that it was "a limbo waiting game". In the same interview Woodley spoke despairingly of the chances of her returning to the project in a television format, although noting that she would be open to returning to it as a theatrical film. In February 2017, when it was announced that the fourth film will be a television project, it was announced Woodley had backed out of her starring role. In August 2017, Starz and Lionsgate Television announced that they were beginning to develop the TV series with director Lee Toland Krieger and writer Adam Cozad remaining attached from the original project. In December 2018, Starz announced they were no longer seeking to develop a television series, citing the lack of interest from the cast and network executives.

References

External links
 
 
 

2016 films
2010s action adventure films
2016 science fiction action films
American action adventure films
American science fiction action films
American sequel films
The Divergent Series
Drone films
American dystopian films
Films scored by Joseph Trapanese
Films about security and surveillance
Films based on American novels
Films based on science fiction novels
Films produced by Lucy Fisher
Films produced by Douglas Wick
Films directed by Robert Schwentke
Films shot in Atlanta
Films about genetic engineering
IMAX films
Lionsgate films
Mandeville Films films
Fiction about memory erasure and alteration
American post-apocalyptic films
American science fiction adventure films
Summit Entertainment films
2010s English-language films
2010s American films